Promontorium Kelvin is a headland on the near side of the Moon. It is located in the southeast of the Mare Humorum. It is close to Rupes Kelvin. Its length is about 45 km. It was named after the British scientist, physicist and engineer William Thomson, 1st Baron Kelvin.

References

External links

Promontorium Kelvin at Moon Wiki
  - features the promontory

Mountains on the Moon
William Thomson, 1st Baron Kelvin